The Aammiq Wetland (the name is also sometimes transliterated as "Ammiq"or "Aamiq") is the largest remaining freshwater wetland in Lebanon, a remnant of much more extensive marshes and lakes that once existed in the Bekaa Valley. It has been designated an Important Bird Area in the Middle East (BirdLife International, 1994), is included in the Directory of Wetlands in the Middle East (IUCN, 1995), was declared Ramsar Convention site number 978 in 1999, and most recently (2005) was designated, with Al Shouf Cedar Nature Reserve, a “Biosphere reserve” by UNESCO.

Description 
The swamp lies on one of the most important bird migration routes in the world, and over 250 species of birds have been recorded in the area, including the globally vulnerable greater spotted eagle (Aquila clanga), eastern imperial eagle (Aquila heliaca), and lesser kestrel (Falco naumanni). Records of globally near-threatened bird species at the wetland include great snipe (Gallinago media), ferruginous duck (Aythya nyroca) and pallid harrier (Circus macrourus). In addition to the great diversity of birds in the area, there are a wide variety of animals living in and around the marsh. Twenty-three species of mammals have been recorded, including jungle cat (Felis chaus) and European otter (Lutra lutra). Five species of amphibians and twelve species of reptiles have been recorded, and a two-year weekly butterfly survey found fifty-three species of butterflies in the area. The wetland lies 7 km SSW of the city of Qab Elias on the eastern edge of Mount Lebanon. The main area of reedbeds and open pools covers 253 ha, stretching east from the foot of the mountains to the Litani River in a long strip. Rain and snow falling on the high ridge of Barouk mountain to the west provide water for the wetland. Most rain falls between December and March, soaking quickly through layers of limestone in the mountains and emerging as springs in the valley floor. The water is particularly pure, as it has not been polluted by agricultural fertilizers, pesticides, etc. In recent years the marsh dried out by mid-July (with the exception of a few deep pools and ditches) and did not fill up again until January or February. However, the introduction by A Rocha's involvement of improved management techniques, such as the reduced pumping of water for irrigation of nearby farmland, and changes to less “thirsty” crops, has helped the marsh remain wet throughout the year. This has resulted in a significant increase in wintering and breeding water birds since 2002. Surrounding the open water and reed bed are areas of rough grazing, cultivated land, drainage ditches, and an avenue of trees, all adding to the diversity of habitats in the area. On the nearby mountain slopes, small wooded areas and rocky shrubland give an even greater variety of habitats and species. Behind the nearby village of Aammiq are woods where Syrian woodpecker (Dendrocopus syriacus) and Syrian serin (Serinus syriacus) can be found. In spring and summer, shrubby hillsides are home to assorted buntings, wheatears, warblers and shrikes, and rocky gorges host western rock nuthatch (Sitta neumayer) and Eurasian eagle owl (Bubo bubo). Mammals present include Caucasian squirrel, wildcat, wild boar and the elusive Indian porcupine.

The Aammiq Wetland and some of the surrounding area is in the process of being declared a National Reserve. The main landowning family is fully engaged in the preservation of this very important ecosystem and initial plans to develop the area for ecotourism are underway.

Scientific studies 
Since the founding of A Rocha Lebanon in 1996, a great deal of scientific study has been undertaken and much has been learned about the flora and fauna of Lebanon and in particular the West Bekaa. Research has been conducted in the form of preliminary studies, short- and long-term projects and an ongoing monitoring program. A number of short-term research projects have been carried out which have greatly increased the knowledge of bird life in Lebanon, such as an autumn migrant bird survey (1998), a survey of birds on the mountain slopes above Aammiq (1999/2000), and a study of the autumn routes of migrating raptors and other soaring birds in Lebanon (2000). Various archaeological studies have been carried out on the site of Aammiq including pollen core analysis.

Fauna 
Mammals: The following descriptions of mammals of the Ammiq wetlands have all been recorded by A Rocha personnel in the Aammiq region from 1997 onwards. The region covered includes not just the valley floor wetlands but also the adjacent farmlands and the slopes of Mount Barouk. In addition to these, other mammal species are probably present but have not yet been positively identified. One mammal of interest is the European otter Lutra lutra which was reported in the Aammiq wetlands prior to 1975; its reappearance was confirmed in June 2003. Water buffalos were introduced to the swamp in order to maintain the health of the vegetation cover and the swamp itself, since buffalo graze wetlands in a more efficient way than other herbivores. The mammals recorded in the region include: southern white-breasted hedgehog (Erinaceus concolor), Cape hare (Lepus capensis), Caucasian squirrel (Sciurus anomalus), Indian porcupine (Hystrix indica), gray wolf (Canis lupus), red fox (Vulpes vulpes), European otter (Lutra lutra), European badger (Meles meles), striped hyena (Hyaena hyaena), mountain gazelle (Gazella gazella), wild boar (Sus scrofa).

Birds: Nearly 260 bird species have been recorded in the Aammiq region either by A Rocha personnel or people working with A Rocha from 1996 onwards. The Aammiq region includes not just the valley floor wetlands but also the adjacent farmlands and the sometimes wooded rocky slopes of Mount Barouk.
The listing of these birds does not give any idea of their abundance or status. While some of the birds recorded below are residents, others are passage migrants. Some of these, such as the white stork and the lesser spotted eagle, may pass over Aammiq in flocks of hundreds at a time. Other migrants fly over in far smaller numbers. Species include: pygmy cormorant (Phalacrocorax pygmeus), white pelican (Pelecanus onocrotalus), greater flamingo (Phoenicopterus rubber), ferruginous duck (Aythya nyroca), osprey (Pandion haliaetus), Verreaux's eagle (Aquila verreauxii), peregrine falcon (Falco peregrinus), common crane (Grus grus), rock pigeon (Columba livia).

Amphibians and reptiles: The amphibians and reptiles listed below have been recorded in the Aammiq region either by A Rocha personnel or people working with A Rocha from 1996 onwards. As with the other species lists, the Aammiq region is here taken to include not just the valley floor wetlands, which are very rich in reptiles, but also the adjacent farmlands and the rocky slopes of Mount Barouk. Herpetology, the study of reptiles and amphibians, is a specialised field and as yet there has been no systematic A Rocha herpetological survey of this area. Far more species are known to exist in the area than the ones reported. Species include: European green toad (Bufo viridis), Levantine frog (Pelophylax bedriagae), Levant green lizard (Lacerta media), European worm snake (Typhlops vermicularis), Levant viper (Macrovipera lebetina).

Moths, butterflies, and dragonflies:
As with many other groups, the moths of the Aammiq region are poorly known. The list below represents an incomplete and provisional list of species so far recorded, though the Aammiq region is rich in butterflies. A Rocha personnel recorded several new records of species since 1998 such as: Oriental marbled skipper (Carcharodus boeticus), swallowtail (Papilio machaon), scarce swallowtail (Iphiclides podalirius), false Apollo (Archon apollinus), large white (Pieris brassicae), plain tiger (Danaus chrysippus), long-tailed blue (Lampides boeticus). Also the Aammiq region has a surprising diversity of dragonflies which can be divided into two groups, the Zygoptera (damselflies) and the Anisoptera (the insects commonly referred to as dragonflies), species include: azure damselfly (Coenagrion puella), blue-tailed damselfly (Ischnura elegans), emperor dragonfly (Anax imperator), southern darter (Sympetrum meridionale), scarlet dragonfly (Crocothemis erythraea).

Environmental education 
A Rocha Lebanon has run the environmental education programme at the Aammiq Wetland since 1998. Aimed at school and university students, it has seen nearly 6000 young people come through the program to date. The program is tied in with the Lebanese schools' national curriculum and provides an opportunity for students to learn about wetland ecosystems first hand. Supporting learning in the classroom is important, but an educational visit to the marsh aims to provide students with "hands on" experiences for them to get a physical appreciation of the beauty and complexity of this unique environment.

References

External links 
 official A Rocha Lebanon  website
 BirdLife Data Zone file: Aammiq Wetland IBA
 Location on Wikimapia

Wetlands of Lebanon
Nature reserves in Lebanon
Important Bird Areas of Lebanon
Ramsar sites in Lebanon
Biosphere reserves of Lebanon
Tourist attractions in Lebanon
Zahlé District
Tourism in Lebanon